Mikhail Alekseyevich Yegorov (May 5, 1923 – June 20, 1975), along with Meliton Kantaria and Alexei Berest, was one of the three soldiers credited with raising the Soviet flag over the Reichstag on the 2 May 1945 after the Battle of Berlin.

Yegorov joined the partisans during the Nazi occupation, then enlisted in the Red Army in late 1944 as an infantry scout. He worked at a dairy farm after leaving the army. In 1975, he was killed in a traffic accident at the age of 52.

Honours and awards
Hero of the Soviet Union
Order of Lenin
Order of the Red Banner
Order of the Patriotic War 2nd class
Order of the Red Star
Order of Glory 3rd class
Medal "Partisan of the Patriotic War" 1st class
Jubilee Medal "For Military Valour in Commemoration of the 100th Anniversary since the Birth of Vladimir Il'ich Lenin"
Medal "For the Victory over Germany in the Great Patriotic War 1941–1945"
Jubilee Medal "Twenty Years of Victory in the Great Patriotic War 1941-1945"
Jubilee Medal "Thirty Years of Victory in the Great Patriotic War 1941-1945"
Medal "For the Capture of Berlin"
Jubilee Medal "50 Years of the Armed Forces of the USSR"

See also 
Raising the Flag on Iwo Jima
Meliton Kantaria
Alexei Berest
Mikhail Minin
Abdulkhakim Ismailov
Rakhimzhan Qoshqarbaev

References
Hastings, Max. Armageddon. 1st ed. New York City: Alfred A. Knopf, 2005.

External links
Mikhail Alekseevich Yegorov 

1923 births
1975 deaths
People from Rudnyansky District, Smolensk Oblast
People from Smolensky Uyezd
Soviet military personnel of World War II
Battle of Berlin
People notable for being the subject of a specific photograph
Heroes of the Soviet Union
Road incident deaths in the Soviet Union
Road incident deaths in Russia
Partisans during World War II